Moby Dick (Korean: 모비딕; RR: Mobidik) is a 2011 South Korean thriller written by Park In-je and Park Shin-kyu, directed by Park In-je, and starring Hwang Jung-min.

The film is the feature directing debut of Park In-je, grand prizewinner of the 2003 Mise-en-Scene Genre Film Festival. Park was working on a screenplay about a reporter when he came across an account of Private Yun Seok-yang, a soldier at the Defense Security Command of Korea’s Armed Forces. In 1990 Yun deserted his camp, carrying a floppy disk that contained a list of national leaders, including former presidents, religious leaders, politicians, and social activists, that the DSC had been illegally investigating; he made a declaration of conscience and revealed the contents of the disk at a press conference. Moby Dick, loosely based on Yun’s story, follows a journalist’s attempts to investigate a secret organization that controls the government. The title Moby Dick alludes to Herman Melville's novel Moby-Dick by conjuring up an overwhelming entity whose size makes it impossible to see all at once; Moby Dick was also the name of a café near Seoul University that was used by the DSC to investigate ordinary citizens. Starring actor Hwang Jung-min interviewed bureau-level reporters to help prepare for his role.

The film was shot during the coldest winter in South Korea in 30 years. Shooting began in mid-October 2010 and ended in February 2011, with the cast and crew enduring the cold for five months.

Plot 
In winter 1994, an explosion occurs at the fictional Balam Bridge on the outskirts of Seoul and is attributed to terrorists. Social affairs reporter Lee Bang-woo (Hwang) begins to investigate the case when an old friend, Yoon-hyuk (Jin), hands him some secret documents and claims that the explosion was committed intentionally by the government. Lee teams up with fellow journalists Sung Hyo-kwan (Kim Min-hee) and Son Jin-ki (Kim Sang-ho) to pursue the truth. Their investigation reveals what seems to be a secret group that operates the government, and they begin to unravel a string of conspiracies that become far deadlier than they anticipated.

Cast 

 Hwang Jung-min as Lee Bang-woo
 Kim Min-hee as Sung Hyo-kwan
 Jin Goo as Yoon-hyuk
 Kim Sang-ho as Son Jin-ki
 Han Soo-yeon as Seo Eun-sook
 Kim Min-Jae as Kim Yong-sung
 Lee Geung-young as Professor Jang
 Jung Man-sik as Nam Seon-soo
 Jo Hee-bong as Im Jik-sa
 Bae Seong-woo as President Maeng
 Ahn Gil-kang as Detective Ma
 Kim Bo-yeon as Director Jo

Release & Reception 
The film was released on June 9, 2011, to generally positive reviews for its 90s-era settings, moody cinematography, and cast performances. It grossed around $3 million at the South Korean box office.

References

External links
 
 
 Moby Dick on Rotten Tomatoes

2011 films
2010s Korean-language films
2011 crime thriller films
South Korean crime thriller films
2010s South Korean films